The 2015–16 Ohio State Buckeyes men's basketball team represented Ohio State University in the 2015–16 NCAA Division I men's basketball season.  Their head coach was Thad Matta, in his 12th season with the Buckeyes. They played its home games at Value City Arena in Columbus, Ohio and were members of the Big Ten Conference. They finished the season 21–14, 11–7 in Big Ten play to finish in seventh place. They defeated Penn State in the second round of the Big Ten tournament to advance to the quarterfinals where they lost to Michigan State. They received an invitation to the National Invitational tournament where they defeated Akron in the first round to advance to the second round where they lost to Florida.

Previous season
The Buckeyes finished the 2014–15 season 24–11, 11–7 in Big Ten play to finish in sixth place. They advanced to the quarterfinals of the Big Ten tournament where they lost to Michigan State. They received an at-large bid to the NCAA tournament where they defeated VCU in the second round before losing in the third round to Arizona.

Departures

Recruiting Class of 2015

Recruiting Class of 2016

Roster

Schedule

|-
!colspan=9 style="background:#B31021; color:white;"| Exhibition

|-
!colspan=9 style="background:#B31021; color:white;"| Non-conference regular season

|-
!colspan=9 style="background:#B31021; color:white;"| Big Ten regular season

|-
!colspan=9 style="background:#B31021; color:white;"| Big Ten tournament

|-
!colspan=9 style="background:#B31021; color:white;"| NIT

Source:

See also
2015–16 Ohio State Buckeyes women's basketball team

References

Ohio State Buckeyes men's basketball seasons
Ohio State
Ohio State
Ohio State Buckeyes
Ohio State Buckeyes